Neobidessus is a genus of beetles in the family Dytiscidae, containing the following species:

 Neobidessus alternatus (Régimbart, 1889)
 Neobidessus alvarengai Young, 1981
 Neobidessus atomus (Guignot, 1957)
 Neobidessus ayapel Young, 1981
 Neobidessus bokermanni Young, 1981
 Neobidessus bolivari Young, 1981
 Neobidessus bordoni Young, 1981
 Neobidessus confusus Young, 1981
 Neobidessus corumbensis (Zimmermann, 1921)
 Neobidessus curticornis (Régimbart, 1903)
 Neobidessus discoidalis (Sharp, 1882)
 Neobidessus hylaeus Young, 1977
 Neobidessus lilliputanus (Aubé, 1838)
 Neobidessus obtusoides Young, 1977
 Neobidessus obtusus (Sharp, 1882)
 Neobidessus persimilis (Régimbart, 1895)
 Neobidessus phyllisae Young, 1981
 Neobidessus pulloides Young, 1977
 Neobidessus pullus (LeConte, 1855)
 Neobidessus spangleri Young, 1977
 Neobidessus subvittatus (Zimmermann, 1921)
 Neobidessus surinamensis (Régimbart, 1889)
 Neobidessus tricorni Young, 1981
 Neobidessus trilineatus (Zimmermann, 1925)
 Neobidessus vittatipennis (Zimmermann, 1921)
 Neobidessus whitcombi Young, 1981
 Neobidessus woodruffi Young, 1981
 Neobidessus youngi (Leech, 1948)

References

Dytiscidae